The Nuremberg–Munich high-speed railway line is a  high-speed railway running between the two largest cities in Bavaria, Germany: Nuremberg and Munich.

The northern section, between Nuremberg and Ingolstadt, is a  track built between 1998 and 2006. In order to minimize damage to the environment, it runs for the most part right next to Bundesautobahn 9. The southern section, between Ingolstadt and Munich, is 19th-century track. Between 2010 and 2013, further upgrades to the midsection of the track will be done.

Both long-distance and regional services operate on the line. Intercity-Express trains reach the tracks'  speed-limit. The Allersberg-Express, a RegionalBahn shuttle service, was operated between Allersberg and Nuremberg until December 2020 when it was replaced by S5 of the Nuremberg S-Bahn. The line was officially inaugurated on May 13, 2006. Limited operation with a twice-hourly long-distance service started on 28 May 2006. The line has been in full operation since December 2006. Compared to the former track via Augsburg, it cut off , or about 30 minutes journey time on long-distance and an hour on regional trains.

Most of the track is equipped with Linienzugbeeinflussung and GSM-R. ETCS was planned to be introduced in 2009, although this seems to be delayed until at least 2017. The total costs (as of January 2006) were about €3.6 billion. The line is part of the Line 1 of Trans-European Transport Networks (TEN-T).

History

The Munich–Ingolstadt line was opened in 1867 and was extended to Treuchtlingen as the Ingolstadt–Treuchtlingen line in 1870. 

The first proposal for a high-speed line dates back to 1983, when the Nuremberg section of Deutsche Bundesbahn proposed a more direct line between Nuremberg and Munich. The project was added to the 1985 federal traffic infrastructure plan. The following years were marked by heated debate on the route of the line, in particular if it should run via Ingolstadt or Augsburg. While the Ingolstadt line is much more direct than the existing Augsburg route, the metropolitan area of Augsburg is considered much larger than Ingolstadt's. Large-scale construction began in 1998, when numerous disputes had finally been settled and the total cost was estimated to be €2.3 billion. The €1.3 billion cost increase arose from numerous geological problems found during construction and additional works required to meet environmental and security concerns.

Operations
Besides high speed ICE trains, the line is also served by regional trains and (since the 2020 schedule change) S5 of the Nuremberg S-Bahn which is operated with DB Class 1440 (Alstom Coradia Continental) trainsets. Regional services are often operated with DB-Class-101–hauled former Intercity coaches. Those aging coaches and locomotives are to be replaced with Škoda-Transportation–produced DB Class 102 locomotives hauling bilevel coaches. They finally entered service in December 2020.

See also 
 High-speed rail in Germany

References

External links 
Datasheet at structurae.de
Article at railway-technology.com

High-speed railway lines in Germany
Railway lines in Bavaria
Rail transport in Nuremberg
Buildings and structures in Roth (district)
Buildings and structures in Dachau (district)
Ingolstadt
Rail transport in Munich